was a village located in Kashima District, Ibaraki Prefecture, Japan.

On September 1, 1995, Ōno was absorbed into the town of Kashima (also from Kashima District) to create the city of Kashima.

Dissolved municipalities of Ibaraki Prefecture
Kashima, Ibaraki
Populated places established in 1955
Populated places disestablished in 1995
1955 establishments in Japan
1995 disestablishments in Japan